The Greater Western Sydney Giants' 2016 season is the club's fifth season in the Australian Football League (AFL). The Giants finished in fourth place at the end of the 2016 season, and won their first ever finals game.

Playing squad

Ladder

References

2016 Australian Football League season
Greater Western Sydney Giants seasons